Pyrene may refer to:

Pyrene, a chemical compound.
Carbon tetrachloride, pyrene is the brand name used by the Pyrene Manufacturing Company for Carbon tetrachloride.
Pyrene (mythology), consort of Ares and the mother of Cycnus in Greek mythology
Pyrene, a Celtic city near the sources of the Danube mentioned by Herodotus: see Heuneburg
The Pyrene Company Limited, a manufacturer of firefighting equipment
 The Pyrene Building, Golden Mile (Brentford), a noted former Pyrene Company factory in London, England in the Art Deco style
Pyrene (gastropod), a genus of sea snails from the family Columbellidae
Pyrena, a kind of nutlet
Pyrenees, a mountain range between France and Spain

See also
 Pyrenoid, a stone-like structure within the chloroplast of hornworts and some algae